Engineers Without Borders International (EWB-I) is an association of individual Engineers Without Borders/ groups.  EWB-I facilitates collaboration and the exchange of information among the member groups. EWB-I helps its member groups develop their capacity to assist underserved communities in their respective countries and around the world.

Organizational structure
EWB-I is a virtual organization with staff located in both the United States and South Africa.  EWB-I is run by an international board, composed of representatives of the EWB/ISF groups.

The member groups of EWB-I support the association's vision for "A sustainable world where engineering enables long-term positive social and global development for the benefit of people and the environment everywhere."  EWB-I seeks to promote collaboration and fulfill its mission "To be the beating heart of the engineering movement for sustainable global development, building and evolving engineering capacity throughout the world.

Projects
Projects conducted by individual EWB/ISF member groups are grassroots and small and are not usually addressed by in-country consulting firms. Through their work and projects, EWB-I member groups contribute to meeting the UN Millennium Development Goals (MDGs) and Sustainable Development Goals (SDGs) through capacity building in their projects. EWB-I also endorses the Earth Charter and the Universal Declaration of Human Rights.

International coordination 
While each member group is fully independent and autonomous, EWB-I provides a platform for its member groups, affiliates, and outside organizations 

 Contribute to meeting the MDGs and SDGs through capacity building in local projects
 Collaborate on projects and studies worldwide
 Share ideas, experiences, technical knowledge, and documentation
 Develop partnerships on community projects
 Address more global issues and projects
 Coordinate student exchanges, internships, and professional volunteers
 Advertise meetings and events
 Train and connect engineering professionals and students around the world
 Create synergy between their members

EWB-International also facilitates the start-up of new groups in the areas where none currently exist.  EWB-I consists of member groups, provisional member groups, and start-up groups. Membership requires that all member groups adhere to high professional and ethical standards as stated in the EWB-I Bylaws.

Selected EWB-I member organizations 

Ingenieria Sin Fronteras (Argentina)
Engineers Without Borders (Australia)
Engineers Without Borders (Bangladesh)
Ingénieurs Sans Frontières (Belgium)
 Ingenieurs zonder Grenzen (Belgium)
Engineers Without Borders (Bolivia)
Engenheiros Sem Fronteiras (Brazil)
Engineers Without Borders (Burundi)
Engineers Without Borders (Cambodia)
Ingénieurs Sans Frontières (Cameroon)
Engineers Without Borders (Canada)
Ingeniería Sin Fronteras (Chile)
Engineers Without Borders (Colombia)
Engineers Without Borders (Congo-DRC)
Engineers Without Borders (Côte d'Ivoire)
Engineers Without Borders (Denmark)
Engineers Without Borders (Ecuador)
Engineers Without Borders (Egypt)
Engineers Without Borders (Finland)
Engineers Without Borders (Gabon)
Ingenieurs zonder Grenzen (Germany)
Engineers Without Borders (Ghana)
Engineers Without Borders (Greece)
Engineers Without Borders (Honduras)
Engineers Without Borders (Hong Kong)
 Engineers Without Borders (India)
Engineers Without Borders (Iran)
Engineers Without Borders (Iraq)
Engineers Without Borders (Israel)
Engineers Without Borders (Jordan)
Engineers Without Borders (Kenya)
Engineers Without Borders (Korea)
Engineers Without Borders (Kosovo)
Engineers Without Borders (Kuwait)
Engineers Without Borders (Lebanon)
Inzeneri bez Granici  (Macedonia)
Engineers Without Borders (Malawi)
Engineers Without Borders (Malaysia)
Ingenieros Sin Fronteras (Mexico)
Engineers Without Borders (Nepal)
Engineers Without Borders (Netherlands)
Engineers Without Borders (New Zealand)
Engineers Without Borders (Nigeria)
Ingeniører uten grenser (Norway)
Engineers Without Borders (Pakistan)
Engineers Without Borders (Palestine)
Engineers Without Borders (Panama)
Engineers Without Borders (Peru)
Engineers Without Borders (Portugal)
Engineers Without Borders (Qatar)
Engineers Without Borders (Rwanda)
Engineers Without Borders (Sierra Leone)
Engineers Without Borders (Singapore)
Engineers Without Borders (South Africa)
Engineers Without Borders (Sri Lanka)
Engineers Without Borders (Sudan)
Ingenjörer utan gränser (Sweden)
Engineers Without Borders (Switzerland)
Engineers Without Borders (Syria)
Engineers Without Borders (Tanzania)
Engineers Without Borders (Turkey)
Engineers Without Borders (UAE)
Engineers Without Borders (Uganda)
Engineers Without Borders (UK)
 Engineers Without Borders (USA)
 Engineers Without Borders (Venezuela)

Engineers Without Borders International is not in any way affiliated with Doctors Without Borders, which is a registered trademark of Bureau International de Medecins Sans Frontieres.

See also 
 Engineers Without Borders – includes information about similarly named organizations not affiliated with EWB-I

References

External links
EWB-I official website
EWB-I list of member organizations

 
Engineering organizations